Rabi Bhusan Das (date of birth unknown; died 21 April 1998) was an Indian footballer. He competed in the men's tournament at the 1948 Summer Olympics.

Honours

Mohun Bagan
Durand Cup: 1953

Bengal
Santosh Trophy: 1945-46, 1953–54

References

External links
 

Year of birth missing
1998 deaths
Footballers from Kolkata
Indian footballers
India international footballers
Olympic footballers of India
Footballers at the 1948 Summer Olympics
Association football forwards
Mohun Bagan AC players
Calcutta Football League players